David R. Mills (born 1946) is a researcher who has been active in solar energy research in Australia since 1975, working at the University of Sydney as a Principal Research Fellow  till 2005.

Mills specializes in solar thermal electricity development, which he believes is one cornerstone of the future sustainable energy economy. His work is predominately in the field of solar spectrum selective materials and non-imaging optics. The prime focus of his research is planning 24-hour solar plants to eliminate coal use.

In 2002 Mills became chairman of Solar Heat and Power, an Australian company he co-founded with Professor Graham Morrison (UNSW) and Peter Le Lievre. Solar Heat and Power went on to develop innovative CLFR type line focus solar thermal power systems in Australia, Europe, and North America.

Mills is a former president of the International Solar Energy Society, and was the first Chair of the International Solar Cities Initiative.

He is currently chief scientific officer and co-founder at Ausra Inc.

See also

Ausra (company)

References

External links
Solar takes off with US power supply deal (2 videos)
 Solar Thermal Power as the plausible basis of grid supply, David Mills & Robert Morgan, 2007  
Australia ignoring solar power, says pioneer
Cloudy Future for Solar Innovators
Solar Future
Solar power innovator leaves Australia
Solar Thermal Electricity
 Stanwell Solar Thermal Power Project
Tackling Global Emissions with Renewable Energy technology
Solar takes off with US power supply deal

Academic staff of the University of Sydney
Living people
People associated with solar power
1946 births